is a district located in Okhotsk Subprefecture, Hokkaido, Japan.

As of 2004, the district has an estimated population of 24,608 and a population density of 17.25 persons per km2. The total area is 1,426.74 km2.

In 1869, when Hokkaido was divided into 11 provinces and 86 districts, Shari was placed in Kitami Province.

Towns and villages
Kiyosato
Koshimizu
Shari

Districts in Hokkaido